WFHA-LP (94.1 FM) was a low-powered radio station licensed to Melbourne, Florida, United States. The station's broadcast license was held by the Windover Farms of Melbourne Homeowners' Association.

The station broadcast a variety of music, including smooth jazz and oldies, as part of a community-oriented adult contemporary music format. Specialty programming included Planetary Radio, a weekly show about space exploration and astronomy produced by The Planetary Society, and Medical Edge Radio News, a daily health segment produced by the Mayo Clinic.

History
The licensee applied to the Federal Communications Commission (FCC) for the construction permit to build this station in June 2001. The FCC granted this permit on June 8, 2004, with a scheduled expiration date of December 8, 2005. The station was assigned its callsign WFHA-LP on June 19, 2004. It was licensed to Windover Farms of Melbourne Homeowners' Association, Inc. from which the call sign is derived. In November 2004, with construction complete and testing underway, the station applied for its license to cover. WFHA-LP was granted that license on March 3, 2005.

The licensee surrendered WFHA-LP's license to the FCC on October 11, 2022, due to the death of the station's operator. The FCC cancelled the license on November 15, 2022.

Coverage area

The station served Windover Farms, Lake Washington, Suntree, northern Melbourne, and southern Viera, Florida. Because of its short transmitter tower and ERP of only 100 watts, it was impossible to pick up this station west of Lake Washington, a mile south of Sarno Road, and the rest of Brevard County. However, its signal covered about 44,000 people in a  area and was able to reach the Atlantic Ocean.

See also
List of community radio stations in the United States

References

External links
 

FHA-LP
FHA-LP
Mainstream adult contemporary radio stations in the United States
Defunct community radio stations in the United States
Radio stations established in 2005
Radio stations disestablished in 2022
Brevard County, Florida
2005 establishments in Florida
2022 disestablishments in Florida